Girls 2 (also titled Girls vs Gangsters) is a 2018 Chinese-Hong Kong comedy film directed by Wong Chun-chun and starring Fiona Sit, Ivy Chen, Janine Chang, Mike Tyson, and Wang Shuilin. The film is a sequel to the 2014 film Girls and was released on March 2, 2018, in China.

Cast
 Fiona Sit as Kimmy
 Ivy Chen as Xiwen
 Janine Chang as Jialan
 Mike Tyson as Dragon
 Wang Shuilin as Jingjing
 Trần Bảo Sơn (Chen Baoshan) as Gang leader
 Vila Fan as Gang leader ex-wife (Mariya)
 Nguyễn Kim Hồng @ Elly Trần as Gang assistant
 Gus Liem as Priest
 Cecilia Sun as Shop Girl
 Loi Tran as Gigolo leader
 Petey Majik Nguyễn as Magician
 Nina Komolova as Magician's assistant
 Wen-Hsueh Lu @ Louis Lo as Xiwen's father
 Tzu-Hui Tseng as Xiwen's mother

Production
Shooting began in July 2016 and ended in August 2016. This film was primarily shot in Vietnam.

Release
The film was released in China on March 2, 2018.

References

External links
 
 
 

2018 films
Chinese romantic comedy films
Films shot in Vietnam
2010s Mandarin-language films
Films directed by Wong Chun-chun